Rudramadevi is a 2015 Indian Telugu-language 3D biographical action film based on the life of Rudrama Devi, one of the prominent rulers of the Kakatiya dynasty in the Deccan, and one of the few ruling queens in Indian history. The film written and directed by Gunasekhar features Anushka Shetty in a titular role as Rudramadevi, alongside an ensemble cast including Allu Arjun, Rana Daggubati, Vikramjeet Virk, Krishnam Raju, Prakash Raj, Suman, Nithya Menen, Adithya, and Catherine Tresa. The film is narrated by Chiranjeevi. The film's soundtrack and background score were composed by Ilaiyaraaja.

Rudhramadevi was released worldwide on 9 October 2015, with dubbed versions in Hindi and Malayalam languages. The Tamil  version was released by Sri Thenandal Films on 16 October. The film became the fifth highest opening day grossing Indian film of 2015. It grossed 32 crore worldwide in the opening weekend.

Plot 
Ganapatideva (Krishnam Raju) is the emperor of the Kakatiya dynasty who rules the Kakatiya Empire from Orugallu (present day Warangal, Telangana) as its capital city. There are only two threats to Ganapati's rule. Murari Devudu (Adithya Menon) and Hari Hara Devudu (Suman), dukes of Kakatiya, are both obviously unsatisfied with Ganapati's reign, and plot to usurp the throne. Emperor Singhana of the Devagiri Empire also wishes to conquer the Kakatiyas and name his grandson and heir, Mahadeva, as the king. Meanwhile, Ganapati's wife is pregnant. Everyone prays for a boy child, because a prince can repel the Devagiri Empire and serve as a successor to the throne. A priest working for Murari and Hari Hara predicts Ganapati's baby will be a girl who will be the saviour of the kingdom.

Ganapati's baby indeed turns out to be a girl, Rudramadevi (Anushka Shetty). Her birth disappoints Ganapati, who, being helpless, takes advice from his prime minister, Siva Devayya (Prakash Raj), to announce the baby to be a boy – Rudrama. Murari and Hari Hara go mad after hearing the news that Ganapati gets a prince, a successor to be of the crown; they then angrily kill the priest who predicted Rudrama would be a girl before "his" birth. Rudrama's gender and real name are kept secret from everyone other than Ganapati, his wife, and Siva Devayya; even Rudramadevi herself does not know she's a girl in her childhood.

Rudrama is then brought up and trained in a prince's manner. After a few years of training, Rudrama is summoned back to Oragallu for her coronation as the crown prince. At her coronation, she befriends Chalukya Veerabhadra (Rana Daggubati), a neighborhing prince, and forms a friendly rivalry with Gona Ganna Reddy (Allu Arjun), another neighboring prince. She sneaks out of the capital along with Chalukya to bathe in the river. She realizes her gender when she sees an elegant statue of a beautiful woman. After seeing the boys disrobe, she realizes that her body is different from theirs. She then runs to her mother angrily and confusedly to ask the reason for hiding her real gender; her mother confesses the story and tells her the reason was to protect the kingdom. In front of her parents and Siva Devayya, Rudrama swears to continue living as a boy until the kingdom's safety is assured.

Years later, in a sporting event, Naga Devudu, the nephew of Murari and Hari Hara, fails to subdue a raging elephant. Murari and Hari Hara challenge Rudrama to defeat the elephant. Rudrama accepts, however she is unaware that Murari and Hari Hara have rigged the competition so no one can win. Despite this, Rudrama wins the challenge, making her adored by several princesses in the scene, including Muktamba (Nithya Menen). Gona Ganna Reddy, one of Rudrama's playmates in childhood and who was then thrown out of the palace and is now called a traitor, shows up in the scene to confront Rudrama. Gona is now the leader of an opposition army, which has been a threat to Ganapati's position. He manages to escape when Ganapati's army tries to arrest him.

Ganapati, unable to escape from the pressure from inside and outside his palace, decides to get Rudrama married to a princess, and he chooses Muktamba. On their wedding night, Rudrama, in order to protect her secret, tells Muktamba that she has taken a vow of celibacy until the kingdom is safe. The conversation is tapped by a spy of Murari and Hari Hara, and she tells it to the two, making the secret and the fame of the Ganapati's family in danger.

The two plan to reveal the secret and use it as an excuse to force Ganapati off the throne. However, before they can do so, Siva Devayya decides to reveal the secret to the people.

Siva Devayya then announces Rudramadevi's real identity and her to be the queen of the kingdom. The people of Kakatiya, after knowing Ganapati has cheated them for many years, become angry and unsatisfied and strongly object. Rudramadevi is not accepted by the people to be their queen and is hence driven out of the kingdom. Ganapati also loses the trust and support of his people because of this. Murari and Hari Hara take this chance to launch a coup using the secret passageway. They then proclaim that they will rule Oragallu in Mahadeva's name, while maintaining their own power. Before Murari and Hari Hara can kill Siva Devayya, he has a heart attack and dies.

It doesn't take too long for the people to realize that who deserves to rule the kingdom, as Murari and Hari Hara start to prosecute them with higher tax rates and unprecedented cruelty and aristocracy soon after they take power. The desperate people, along with Siva Devayya (who faked his death), then turn to Rudramadevi to apologize and for help. Rudramadevi then forms these people as an opposition army to fight against her own kingdom's army.

Rudramadevi and her army meet Gona Ganna Reddy's army on her way, which is surprisingly not about to attack her, but to help her get her crown back. It is revealed that Gona, who noticed Rudramadevi was a girl in their childhood, is not a traitor but a most loyal warrior of the kingdom. He had already expected that Rudramadevi would lose her power and be driven out of the kingdom one day, so he left the palace, pretending to be driven out for being a traitor, to form his own army to wait for the day.

After they join hands, their united army is greater and stronger than that of Murari and Hari Hara and beats the latter. They also repel and defeat the Devagiri Empire. Rudramadevi then gets her crown back, marries Chalukya, and becomes the first queen in South Indian history.

Cast 

 Anushka Shetty as Rudrama Devi alias Rudradeva Maharaja
 Ulka Gupta as Younger Rudrama Devi
 Allu Arjun as Gona Ganna Reddy
 Rana Daggubati as Chalukya Veerabhadra
 Roshan Meka as Young Chalukya Veerabhadra
 Vikramjeet Virk as Mahadeva Nayakudu
 Krishnam Raju as Ganapatideva
 Prakash Raj as Siva Devayya
 Suman as Hari Hara Devudu
 Nithya Menen as Muktamba
 Catherine Tresa as Anambika
 Adithya as Murari Devudu
 Prabha as Somamba, Ganapati Devudu's wife
 Vinod Kumar as Ganna Reddy's paternal uncle
 Raja Ravindra as Anambika's father
 Aditi Chengappa as Ganapamba 
 Hamsa Nandini as Madanika
 Ajay as Prasadaditya
 Baba Sehgal as Naga Devudu
 Raza Murad as Simhana, King of Devagiri
 Jaya Prakash Reddy as Amba Devudu
 Subbaraya Sharma as Jayapa Naidu
 Venu Madhav as Tittibi
 Arpit Ranka as Varada Reddy
 Akshara Mandhapati as Akshara Devi
 Ravi Prakash
 Vennela Kishore
 Sivaji Raja
 Ahuti Prasad
 Uttej
 Brahmaji
 Dharmavarapu Subramanyam
 Kunal Mukhi

Production 

Director Gunasekhar readied a script based on the life of Rani Rudramadevi. Anushka, Nayanthara and Priyanka Chopra were considered for the title role but Anushka was signed based on her performance in Arundhati. Gunasekhar selected Ilaiyaraja to compose the music and Thotta Tharani for art direction. Mahesh Babu and Jr. NTR were first approached for the role of Gona Ganna Reddy, but both of them rejected the offer. Later, Allu Arjun was eventually selected to do the role. Neeta Lulla designed the costumes. Rapper Baba Sehgal was hired by director Gunasekhar for a role. Vikramjeet Virk, who earlier played a negative role in Ashutosh Gowarikar's Khelein Hum Jee Jaan Sey (2010) and in Puri Jagannadh's 2014 film Heart Attack, was selected to play a negative character named Mahadeva Nayakadu.

The filming was started on 14 February 2013 in Warangal. The first shot was shot at the Thousand Pillar Temple in Warangal. Final schedule of shoot ended in July 2014.

Release 
The film's official trailer was released on 2 March 2015. The film was slated to be released on 26 June 2015, but it was but postponed to 9 October due to technical problems. Telangana state has given entertainment tax exemption for the film.

Legal release online
HeroTalkies has legally released Rudhramadevi in 2D and 3D formats to overseas customers who have 3D TVs.

Reception

Critical response 
Upon release, the film received positive reviews, with critics praising the direction, narration, and Anushka's performance. Belvoir Eagle gave the film 3.5/5 rating, and Kiaara Sindu of The Hans India rated 4/5.

Box office 
The film became the fifth highest opening-day gross of any Indian film in 2015. It grossed  in its first weekend at the domestic box office, and it was finally an average grosser. It made  in its first week.

The Hindi-dubbed version collected  nett from its two weeks of release. The film had an overseas collection of $990,772 in 24 days, and $993,837 in 31 days.

Accolades

Soundtrack 

The soundtrack album and background score were composed by Ilaiyaraaja. The audio music was planned to release separately in Telangana and Andhra Pradesh states having the Chief ministers of these states as chief guests. The songs were released simultaneously in Visakhapatnam and Warangal on 25 July 2015. Deccan Music named it as the Best Telugu Album of the month. The soundtrack for the Tamil version were released on 15 August 2015 and the Malayalam version was released on 4 September 2015, respectively.

Legacy
Rudhramadevi is the first Telugu film to have its recording in London, United Kingdom. The garments and jewellery designed for the lead cast are available in NAC Jewellers in Chennai as Rudhramadevi Collections.

Notes

References

External links 
 

2015 films
2010s action war films
2010s Telugu-language films
Films set in Telangana
Films shot in Telangana
Films shot in Warangal
Films set in the 13th century
Indian 3D films
2015 3D films
History of India in fiction
History of India on film
2010s historical action films
Same-sex marriage in film
Cross-dressing in Indian films
Films set in forests
Films directed by Gunasekhar
Films scored by Ilaiyaraaja
Indian action war films
Indian historical action films
Indian biographical films
Indian epic films
Films about royalty
Biographical films about royalty
Films set in ancient India
Biographical action films
Historical epic films
War epic films
Indian swashbuckler films
Indian nonlinear narrative films
2010s biographical films